Myrica gale is a species of flowering plant in the family Myricaceae, native to parts of Japan, North Korea, Russia, mainland Europe, the British Isles and parts of northern North America, in Canada and the United States. Common names include bog-myrtle, sweet willow, Dutch myrtle, and sweetgale.

Description
The flowers are catkins, with male and female catkins on separate plants (dioecious). The fruit is a small drupe.

Distribution and habitat
Bog-myrtle is distributed throughout parts of the Northern Hemisphere, including:
Japan, North Korea, Russia, mainland Europe, the British Isles, Canada and the United States.

It typically grows in acidic peat bogs, and to cope with these difficult nitrogen-poor growing conditions, the roots have nitrogen-fixing actinobacteria which enable the plants to grow.

Ecology

Sweetgale can grow in a narrow band in the intertidal zone, especially if logs have been washed into the estuary on which to establish itself.  It is a favorite food of beavers, and low beaver dams can be found in the intertidal zone if sufficient sweetgale is present.  The ponds thus formed are often completely submerged at high tide but retain enough water at low tide to provide refuge for fish.  If too deep for predation by wading birds, juvenile salmon may flourish.

Uses
The foliage has a sweet resinous scent and is a traditional insect repellent, used by campers to keep biting insects out of tents. It is also a traditional component of royal wedding bouquets and is used variously in perfumery and as a condiment.

In Scotland, UK, it has been traditionally used to ward off the Highland midge, and it is marketed as an insect repellent and as an ingredient in some soaps.

Queen Victoria was given a sprig of bog-myrtle which she planted on the Isle of Wight. Her daughter used some of the plant that grew in her wedding bouquet, starting a royal tradition.

Food and medicine
The leaves can be dried to make tea, and both the nutlets and dried leaves can be used to make a seasoning.

In north-western Europe (Germany, Belgium and the Netherlands), it was much used in a mixture called gruit as a flavouring for beer from the Middle Ages to the 16th century, but it fell into disuse after hops supplanted gruit herbs for political and economic reasons. In modern times, some brewers have revisited this historic technique and in Denmark and Sweden the plant is commonly used to prepare home-flavoured schnaps.

In some native cultures in Eastern Canada, the plant has been used as a traditional remedy for stomach aches, fever, bronchial ailments, and liver problems. "The Creole Doctor", an 1886 article by Lafcadio Hearn, discusses the uses of the plant, known locally as " ," in Louisiana creole folk remedies.

In 2007 there were plans to increase production of the plant in Scotland for use as an essential oil for treating sensitive skin and acne. The plant has been listed as an abortifacient and therefore should not be consumed by women who are, or might be, pregnant.

References

External links

 VirginiaTech fact sheet

gale
Flora of Canada
Flora of Europe
Flora of the Northern United States
Plants described in 1753
Taxa named by Carl Linnaeus
Dioecious plants